25 (Toronto) Field Ambulance (25 Fd Amb), formerly 25 (Toronto) Medical Company, is a Canadian Forces Primary Reserve (militia) medical unit in Toronto, Ontario. The company-strength formation is part of 4 Health Services Group, which is headquartered in Montreal, Quebec.

It is the only Primary Reserve medical unit in Toronto. The unit has a medical company, a services support company, and an HQ element.

The unit parades out of Moss Park Armoury and is tasked with providing medical support to 32 Canadian Brigade Group. Members of the unit have served on various UN and NATO missions around the world, including Cyprus, Bosnia and the former Yugoslavia, Haiti, the Sudan and for the Canadian component of the International Security Assistance Force in Afghanistan.

External
25 Field Amb – official website
 CFMS History/Heritage Page
 Canadian Forces Medical Service : Introduction to its History and Heritage
 Canadian War Museum

Medical units and formations of Canada